Brigitte Gabriel (born Hanan Qahwaji, 21 October 1964) is a Lebanese-American conservative author, anti-Islam activist, and founder of the anti-Muslim group ACT! for America.

Early life and education
Gabriel was born in the Marjeyoun District of Lebanon to a Maronite Christian couple. She says that during the Lebanese Civil War, Islamic militants launched an assault on a Lebanese military base near her family's house and destroyed her home. Gabriel, who was ten years old at the time, was injured by shrapnel in the attack. Afterwards, she and her parents were forced to live underground in all that remained, an  bomb shelter for seven years, with only a small kerosene heater, no sanitary systems, no electricity or running water, and little food. Gabriel also stated that she had to crawl in a roadside ditch to a spring for water to evade Muslim snipers.

In the spring of 1978, a bomb explosion caused Gabriel and her parents to become trapped in the shelter for two days. They were eventually rescued by three Christian militia fighters, one of whom befriended Gabriel but was later killed by a land mine.

Gabriel wrote that in 1978 a stranger warned her family of an impending attack by the Islamic militias on all Christians. She says that her life was saved when the Israeli army invaded Lebanon in Operation Litani. Later, when her mother was seriously injured and taken to an Israeli hospital, Gabriel was surprised by the humanity shown by the Israelis, in contrast to the constant propaganda against Jews she saw as a child.

After graduating from high school, Gabriel completed a one-year business administration course at a YWCA in 1984.

Multiple facts surrounding Gabriel's upbringing and autobiography have been disputed, with author Dave Gaubatz calling her account of growing up in Lebanon to be "dramatically fabricated.”

Career
Using the pseudonym Nour Semaan, Gabriel was a news anchor for World News, an Arabic-language evening news broadcast of Middle East Television, which "was then run by Pat Robertson's Christian Broadcasting Network to spread his politically conservative, Pentecostal faith in the Middle East." The broadcasts covered Israel, Egypt, Syria, Jordan and Lebanon. Gabriel reported on the Israeli withdrawal from central Lebanon, the Israeli Security Zone (occupied South Lebanon), and the Palestinian uprising in the West Bank and Gaza. She moved to Israel before emigrating in 1989 to the United States.

In February 2017, Gabriel said that she provided a "national security briefing" at the White House. She met with aides at the White House in March 2017.

ACT! for America 

Her organization, ACT! for America, has been described as anti-Muslim or anti-Islamic. According to The New York Times, ACT! for America draws "on three rather religious and partisan streams in American politics: evangelical Christian conservatives, hard-line defenders of Israel (both Jews and Christians) and Tea Party Republicans". According to The Washington Post, the organization "touted as its 'first accomplishment' its 2008 campaign to shut down a Minnesota Islamic school."

Viewpoints

The Southern Poverty Law Center described ACT! for America as "the largest grassroots anti-Muslim group in the country," and the Council on American–Islamic Relations has described it as "one of the main sources of growing anti-Muslim bigotry in our nation". According to The Guardian, the organization has been "widely identified as anti-Muslim". Gabriel and ACT! have been described as part of the counter-jihad movement by Hope not Hate.

According to Peter Beinart in The Atlantic, "the organization has condemned cities with large Muslim populations for serving halal food in public schools. In 2013, its Houston chapter urged members to 'protest' food companies that certify their meat as compliant with Islamic dietary law. ACT! for America tries to dissuade Jews and Christians from conducting interfaith dialogue with Muslims. And in state after state, it has lobbied state legislatures and school boards to purge textbooks of references that create 'an inaccurate comparison between Islam, Christianity and Judaism.'"

According to Laurie Goodstein of The New York Times, Gabriel "presents a portrait of Islam so thoroughly bent on destruction and domination that it is unrecognizable to those who study or practice the religion." Goodstein says that Gabriel "insists that she is singling out only 'radical Islam' or Muslim 'extremists'—not the vast majority of Muslims or their faith. And yet, in her speeches and her two books, she leaves the opposite impression."

BuzzFeed News described her as "the most influential leader in America's increasingly influential anti-Islam lobby." The Washington Post describes her two books as "alarmist tracts about Islam." Beinart described her as "America's most prominent anti-Muslim activist."

Stephen Lee, a publicist at St. Martin's Press for Gabriel's second book, has called her views "extreme," and Deborah Solomon of The New York Times Magazine, who interviewed Gabriel in August 2008, described her as a "radical Islamophobe". According to Clark Hoyt from The New York Times, over 250 people wrote in to protest that label in the days that followed. Hussein Ibish, a Senior Resident Scholar at The Arab Gulf States Institute in Washington, said that her "agenda is pure unadulterated hatred" and that she has "a pathological hatred of Muslims and other Arabs". Gabriel disputes the charge, saying that "I have no quarrel with Muslims who wish to practice the spiritual tenets of their religion in peace".

Opinions on Islam 
In 2009, Gabriel said that there is a "cancer called Islamofascism" that permeates a Muslim world in which "extreme is mainstream". In June 2014, Gabriel said that "The radicals are estimated to be between 15 to 25 percent" worldwide. In an interview with The Australian Jewish News, she stated that "A practising Muslim who upholds the tenets of the Koran—it's not that simple—a practising Muslim who goes to mosque every Friday, prays five times a day, and who believes that the Koran is the word of God, and who believes that Mohammed is the perfect man and [four inaudible words] is a radical Muslim."

When Gabriel was invited to speak as part of a lecture series organized by Duke University's Jewish community in October 2004, many in attendance were angered by her referring to Arabs as "barbarians." The Freeman Centre for Jewish Life at Duke University later apologized for her comments. Following her speech at a women's campaign event for the Jewish Federation of Ottawa (JFO) in November 2008, many in attendance registered their protests, leading Mitchell Bellman, president and CEO of the JFO, to write a letter in which he acknowledged that Gabriel made, "unacceptable gross generalizations of Arabs and Muslims," distancing his organization from her views.

In 2007 at the Christians United for Israel annual conference, Gabriel delivered a speech that included the following:

The difference, my friends, between Israel and the Arab world is the difference between civilization and barbarism. It's the difference between good and evil [applause]... this is what we're witnessing in the Arabic world, They have no soul, they are dead set on killing and destruction. And in the name of something they call "Allah" which is very different from the God we believe... [applause] because our God is the God of love.

In March 2011 while being interviewed by Eliot Spitzer on CNN, Gabriel defended the speech, saying "I was talking about how Palestinian mothers are encouraging their children to go out and blow themselves up to smithereens just to kill Christians and Jews. And it was in that context that I – that I contrasted the difference between Israel and the Arabic world, was the difference between democracy and barbarism."

Arab–Israeli conflict 
Regarding the two-state solution, Gabriel stated: "Forcing Israel to accept a two-state solution is not going to work unless the Palestinians first are forced to clean up their act and eliminate hatred from their schoolbooks, teach tolerance to their people, and preach acceptance of Israel and the Jews as a neighbor."

Iran–Israel proxy conflict 
In a speech at a conference sponsored by the UN Permanent Mission of Palau and the Aja Eze Foundation, Gabriel said that she viewed Israel as the vanguard in the world's fight against Islamic terrorism, equating Israel's fight against Hamas and Hezbollah with the World's fight against the Islamic State.

Because They Hate
Because They Hate: A Survivor of Islamic Terror Warns America is a 2006 book by Gabriel. It describes her childhood experiences in Lebanon and criticizes radical Islamic expression in the Middle East and elsewhere. The book reached number 12 on The New York Times Best Seller list for political books.

After this book, she released another similar book, They Must Be Stopped.

Responses
The book received mixed responses from critics, some feeling that it provided a critical analysis of Islam and a warning to the American people, while others criticized the tone and the distorted view of the author and her description of Islam as a 'horrible religion.' It has been described as a counter-jihadist book.

Bibliography

See also

 The Truth About Muhammad by Robert Spencer
 Islamophobia

References

External links

 American Congress For Truth website
 Presentation to the Heritage Foundation
 "Polarized points of view", National Post
 C-SPAN Q&A interview about Because They Hate

Videos
 Because They Hate presentation to The Heritage Foundation
 

1964 births
Living people
21st-century American non-fiction writers
21st-century Protestants
21st-century American women writers
American Christian Zionists
American journalists of Arab descent
American Maronites
American political activists
American political commentators
American political journalists
American political writers
American social commentators
American women journalists
Arab supporters of Israel
American critics of Islam
Christian critics of Islam
Counter-jihad activists
Journalists from Virginia
Lebanese emigrants to the United States
Lebanese Maronites
American opinion journalists
People from South Lebanon
People from Virginia Beach, Virginia
Writers from Virginia